Agustín Daniel Pelletieri (born May 17, 1982) is an Argentine former footballer who played as a defensive midfielder.

Career

Club
Pelletieri began his professional career with Lanús in 2002, making his debut in the Primera Division Argentina in 2003. He became an important member of the squad under Ramón Cabrero. In 2007, he was a key part of the squad that won the Apertura 2007 tournament, Lanús' first ever top flight league title. Pelletieri joined AEK Athens on a one-year loan with a purchase option of €2.5 Million but returned to Lanús after the 2008–09 season. In July 2011, Pelletieri signed for Racing Club on a three-year deal. Pelletieri scored his first and only goal with Racing against Argentinos Juniors, helping La Academia to a 2-0 victory.

He signed with Chivas USA of Major League Soccer on February 19, 2014. He scored his first goal for Chivas USA against the Vancouver Whitecaps FC to help his team to 3-1 victory.

He retired as a played in August 2017.

International
Pelletieri was called up four times for the Argentina national football team but did not leave the bench. Pelletieri got called to play against Venezuela, Peru, Colombia and Chile which was his most recent call up in 2008 by Alfio Basile.

Honours
Lanús
Primera División Argentina: Apertura 2007

References

External links
 Argentine Primera statistics

1982 births
Living people
Argentine footballers
Argentine expatriate footballers
Association football midfielders
AEK Athens F.C. players
Club Atlético Lanús footballers
Racing Club de Avellaneda footballers
Chivas USA players
Footballers from Buenos Aires
Expatriate footballers in Greece
Expatriate soccer players in the United States
Argentine Primera División players
Super League Greece players
Major League Soccer players
Outfield association footballers who played in goal